Subhash Mukhopadhyay may refer to:

Subhash Mukhopadhyay (poet) (1919–2003), Indian Bengali poet
Subhash Mukhopadhyay (physician) (1931–1981), Indian gynecologist